General Harry Pulteney (14 February 1686 – 26 October 1767) was an English soldier and Member of Parliament.

He was the younger son of Colonel William Pulteney, of Misterton in Leicestershire, and Mary Floyd. His elder brother, William was one of the leading English statesmen of the 18th century and was eventually created Earl of Bath; he had inherited the family fortune including considerable estates in what is now central London, and also the parliamentary borough of Hedon in Yorkshire.

Harry entered Parliament in as member for Hedon in 1722. His brother William had already been its MP for 17 years, and had offered the second seat to his cousin, Daniel Pulteney; but as Daniel was also elected for the (more prestigious) constituency of Preston, this left a vacancy which Harry was able to fill (William continuing to hold the other seat). He was MP for Hedon until 1734, and again from 1739 to 1741, and also represented Hull for three years from 1744, and was also for a period Governor of Hull.

In 1739 Pulteney became Colonel of the 13th Regiment of Foot, which as was the custom of the time was consequently referred to as Pulteney's Regiment. Under his command the regiment served at Dettingen, Fontenoy and during the Jacobite Rebellion at Falkirk and Culloden. Later they took part in the road-building programme in the Scottish Highlands, and the regiment's officers were among those unsuccessfully investigating the famous Appin murder of 1752. Pulteney was promoted to Major-General in 1743, Lieutenant-General in 1747 and to General in 1765.

Pulteney was his brother's heir and inherited his fortune on his death in 1764, but he himself
died on 26 October 1767 at the age of 81. He was buried in Westminster Abbey.

References
Obituary in The Annual Register (December 1767)

British History Online: Survey of London

Pulteney's Regiment
PULTENEY, Harry (1686–1767). at The History of Parliament Online
Richard Cannon, Historical Record of the Thirteenth, First Somerset, or the Prince Albert's Regiment of Light Infantry, pages 121–122.

British Army generals
British Army personnel of the Jacobite rising of 1745
British Army personnel of the War of the Austrian Succession
1686 births
1767 deaths
Members of the Parliament of Great Britain for English constituencies
British MPs 1741–1747
British MPs 1734–1741
British MPs 1722–1727
British MPs 1727–1734
Somerset Light Infantry officers